Sandy Lake is a small farming community in the Canadian province of Manitoba.

Demographics 

References 

Designated places in Manitoba
Local urban districts in Manitoba